The article is about the stage musical. For the 1956 film, see The Catered Affair.

A Catered Affair is a musical with a book by Harvey Fierstein and music and lyrics by John Bucchino.  It is based on both the 1956 film The Catered Affair written by Gore Vidal and the original 1955 teleplay by Paddy Chayefsky, set in 1953 in the Bronx.  This is the first of Bucchino's scores produced on Broadway.

Production
The show premiered on September 20, 2007 at San Diego's Old Globe Theatre in tryouts, with the official opening on September 30, running through November 11. The show began previews on Broadway at the Walter Kerr Theatre on March 25, 2008 and opened officially on April 17. The production closed on July 27, 2008 after 116 performances and 27 previews. John Doyle directed the production, which stars Fierstein, Faith Prince and Tom Wopat. This production received 12 Drama Desk Award nominations, the most of any show from the 2007–08 season.

Plot synopsis
In the Bronx in 1953, young lovers Jane Hurley and Ralph Halloran decide to get married. Meanwhile, Jane's father, Tom, who owns a third-share in a taxi, agrees with one of his partners, Sam, that they will buy out the share of the third driver, Pasternak.  Jane and Ralph, along with Tom and Sam, happily exclaim the virtues of partnership ("Partners"). Timing is inauspicious, since the bride's brother has just been killed in the Korean War.  The couple does not want a large, expensive wedding, and Tom needs the money to buy out Pasternak.  As Jane's mother Aggie announces that the upcoming wedding will be held quickly and quietly in City Hall, the neighborhood women react ("Women Chatter"). Dinner with Ralph's wealthier family leads Aggie to decide to give the couple a huge formal affair, committing her and Tom's life's savings and bereavement check to an elaborate wedding with an extensive guest list and a lavish catered reception ("Our Only Daughter").  Aggie feels guilty about having neglected Jane and sees an opportunity to plan the white wedding that she herself never had.  The bride's gay Uncle Winston, initially hurt and furious at having been left off the original guest list, becomes a support for Aggie.

Jane is initially beguiled by the attention, and happily picks out a wedding dress ("One White Dress"). But soon relationships are strained to the breaking point under the pressure of costly bridesmaids' dresses, cake layers, and each detail. Aggie confesses to Jane that she and Tom were married because she was pregnant ("Vision"), and because her father bought Tom his share in the taxi.  Finally Jane and Ralph decide to call off the elaborate wedding and party and marry quietly as they had planned. The quiet and unemotional Tom finally expresses his love and caring for Aggie ("I Stayed"), and Tom and Aggie come closer together. As they get ready for the small wedding ceremony, Aggie secretly makes arrangements for Tom to buy his share of the taxi, which arrives in time for him to drive her to their daughter's wedding. Uncle Winston has the last word ("Coney Island"):
  "You paid your money, took the ride, but missed the view."

Song list

Partners — Tom Hurley, Sam, Ralph Halloran and Jane Hurley 
Ralph and Me — Jane Hurley 
Married — Aggie 
Women Chatter — Myra, Pasha and Dolores 
No Fuss — Aggie
Your Children's Happiness — Mr. Halloran and Mrs. Halloran 
Immediate Family — Uncle Winston 
Our Only Daughter — Aggie 
Women Chatter 2 — Dolores, Pasha and Uncle Winston
One White Dress — Jane Hurley and Aggie 
Vision — Aggie 
Don't Ever Stop Saying "I Love You" — Jane Hurley and Ralph Halloran 
I Stayed — Tom Hurley 
Married (Reprise) — Aggie 
Coney Island — Uncle Winston 
Don't Ever Stop Saying "I Love You" (Reprise) — Ralph Halloran, Jane Hurley and Tom Hurley 
Coney Island (Reprise) — Uncle Winston and Company

Roles and original cast
Uncle Winston - Harvey Fierstein 
Aggie Hurley - Faith Prince 
Jane Hurley - Leslie Kritzer
Tom Hurley - Tom Wopat
Ralph Halloran - Matt Cavenaugh
Mr. Halloran/Sam - Philip Hoffman 
Alice/Army Sergeant - Katie Klaus 
Delores/Caterer - Heather MacRae 
Mrs. Halloran/Pasha - Lori Wilner
Myra/Dress Saleswoman - Kristine Zbornik

Recording
The Original Cast recording was recorded by PS Classics and was released on May 27, 2008.

Critical response
A Catered Affair received mixed reviews.

Ben Brantley for The New York Times, wrote: "From Mr. Bucchino’s trickling, self-effacing score to the tight-lipped stoicism of its leading performances, from David Gallo’s tidy tenement-scape set to Zachary Borovay’s tentative photographic projections, this show is all pale, tasteful understatement that seems to be apologizing for asking for your attention... Ms. Prince, best known for her madcap musical turns in revivals of Guys and Dolls and Bells Are Ringing, scrubs down to raw-skinned plainness here. Her performance is tight, disciplined and at times quite affecting, never more so than when Aggie looks silently at some distant horizon of missed opportunities."

Clive Barnes, reviewing for the New York Post, wrote: "Under John Doyle's expert, discreet direction, it emerges less like a musical and more like a play with music: lovely, urban chamber music. But you won't come out humming the tunes, or even the scenery. You'll come out humming the characters."

But Linda Winer, for Newsday, wrote: "How bold to make a Broadway musical on such restrained material as A Catered Affair. How sad that the results are so glum. Despite the dedication of a fine cast...this is a colorless little piece of '50s social realism about a Bronx family that isn't so much emotionally repressed as emotionally deficient."  She panned the "meandering, conversational melodies ba[c]ked by innocuous accompaniments", and the "tasteful but bland production", and concluded: "Winston, who wants the big wedding, observes, 'Resigning oneself to small is sad. Requesting it is tragic.' He could be talking about the show."

Awards and nominations

Original Broadway production

References

External links
A Catered Affair at the IBDB database
Official site
Playbill article, July 18, 2007
John Bucchino official site
Review of the San Diego production
Playbill article, Andrew Gans, April 28, 2008, "Drama Desk Nominees Announced; Catered Affair Garners 12 Noms." Retrieved 4-28-2008 
April 22, 2008, "74th Annual Drama League Award Nominees Announced" Retrieved 5-4-2008

2007 musicals
Broadway musicals
One-act musicals
Musicals based on films
Works about wedding
Musicals based on plays
Musicals by Harvey Fierstein